Judge Bernard Makgabo Ngoepe SC (born 22 October 1947) is a South African Judge serving as Tax Ombudsman of South Africa since 2013. He was the Chancellor of the University of South Africa from 2011 to 2016.

Early life and education
Ngoepe was born in Pietersburg and matriculated at Hebron Institute in Pretoria North in 1967. After school he obtained a BIuris from the University of the North in 1972 and an LL.B. degree from Unisa.

Career

Ngoepe was admitted as an attorney and practised as such for seven years before being admitted as an advocate in 1983. In 1984 he joined the Pretoria Bar and in November 1994, he took silk. He received his first acting position as Judge of the Transvaal Provincial Division for the period February 1995 to June 1995. He was permanently appointed to the Bench in the Transvaal Provincial Division in July 1995.

Ngoepe served as an Acting judge of the Constitutional Court of South Africa from 15 August 1995 to the end of September 1995. He was also the Chancellor of the University of South Africa (Unisa) until December 2016

In 2013, Ngoepe was appointed as the first Tax Ombudsman of South Africa. In September 2016, the South African Treasury extended Judge Ngoepe's term of office as the Tax Ombudsman for a further three years.

Other Positions Held

 Tax Ombud of South Africa (first term 2013 to 2016) (extended for a second three year term in 2016)
Judge of the African Union's African Court on Human and Peoples' Rights from 2006 to 2014
Chancellor, University of South Africa
Chairperson, Magistrates’ Commission
Member, United Nations Environment Programme Global Alliance of Judges on Environmental Law and participant in the United Nations Environment Programme Global Judges Programme Initiatives
Member, Court of Military Appeals
Chairperson, Military Legal Services Division Review Council
Military Appeals. Judge President, Transvaal Provincial Division of the High Court of South Africa
Acting Judge, Supreme Court of Appeal in Bloemfontein
Member, Truth and Reconciliation Commission Amnesty Committee
Acting Judge, Constitutional Court of South Africa (1995)
Judge, Transvaal Provincial Division of the High Court of South Africa
Member, Technical Committee on Constitutional Issues (the Committee drafted the Constitution)
Senior Counsel, High Court of South Africa
Advocate, High Court of South Africa
Founding Member, Black Lawyers Association
Private Practice (1976–1983)

Publications and writings
Final report: Commission of Inquiry into the Ellis Park Stadium Soccer Disaster of 11 April 2001.(2002)

Awards
South African Human Rights Award

References

South African judges
Judges of the African Court on Human and Peoples' Rights
Living people
1947 births
South African Senior Counsel
South African judges of international courts and tribunals